Mekkawi Said (  6 July 1956 – 2 December 2017) was an Egyptian novelist and short story writer.

Early life
He studied at Cairo University. He worked as a scriptwriter and publisher, operating the Al-Dar publishing house in Cairo.

Career
Said published his first book, a collection of short stories, in 1981. Since then, he has published several more short story collections and two novels. His second novel Cairo Swan Song was a bestseller and was nominated for the inaugural Arabic Booker Prize in 2008. The novel has also been translated into English by Adam Talib and published by the AUC Press.

Awards and honors 
Said was a recipient of the Egyptian State Prize for Literature.

References

1956 births
2017 deaths
Writers from Cairo
Egyptian novelists
Egyptian male short story writers
Egyptian short story writers